This is a list of cricket grounds in Rajasthan that have been used for senior cricket matches, including all first-class, List A and Twenty20 cricket games.

International Venues

Domestic Venues

Proposed venue

External links
List of cricket grounds in India - CricketArchive
List of cricket grounds in India - Cricinfo
Indian Premier League grounds  - CricketArchive

R
Lists of cricket grounds in India
Cricket grounds in Rajasthan